The 1954 Soviet football championship was the 22nd seasons of competitive football in the Soviet Union and the 16th among teams of sports societies and factories. Dinamo Moscow won the championship becoming the Soviet domestic champions for the sixth time.

CDSA Moscow was reinstated and placed to the Class A.

Honours

Notes = Number in parentheses is the times that club has won that honour. * indicates new record for competition

Soviet Union football championship

Class A

Class B (final stage)

 
Played in Stalino

Top goalscorers

Class A
Anatoliy Ilyin (Spartak Moscow), Vladimir Ilyin (Dinamo Moscow), Antonin Sochnev (Trudovye Rezervy Leningrad) – 11 goals

References

External links
 1954 Soviet football championship. RSSSF